Black Honey is the debut studio album by British indie rock band Black Honey. It was released on 21 September 2018 by Foxfive Records and received positive reviews from music critics.

The album reached 33 on the UK Albums Chart.

Critical reception

Contactmusic.com stated that the album "blends a mix of Blondie, Elastica, Sleeper, Echobelly and a little bit of The Bangles. The album explores sounds of indie rock and alternative rock, incorporating in some tracks a disco and electro style."

The Sunday Times wrote, "Thrumming with hooks, propulsion and attitudinal lyrics, the band's songs are undoubtedly indebted (here a touch of Blondie and Lana Del Rey, there an echo of Lush and Garbage), but the quartet take these base metals and pound them into new forms. The antidote to manufactured, wipe-clean pop, Black Honey are playing the long game and sounding like winners."

Track listing

Charts

References

2018 debut albums
Black Honey (band) albums